This is the discography of Brian May.

Albums

Studio albums 

A^ Peak position upon reissue in 2021.
B^ Peak position upon reissue in 2022.

Live albums

EPs

Collaboration albums

With Smile

Singles

As lead artist

As featured artist

With Smile

Videos

Video releases
1983: Star Licks Master Series (VHS; in 1993 reissued under the title Master Session)
1994: Live at the Brixton Academy (VHS)
2013: The Candlelight Concerts - Live At Montreux 2013 (DVD/BD) (with Kerry Ellis)

Appearances on various artists compilations

As producer, songwriter or session musician

Producer

Session musician and songwriter

Computer games 
1994: Rise of the Robots (contains reworked tracks from the 1992 album Back to the Light)
1996: Rise 2: Resurrection (contains Cyborg; in 1998 released on the album Another World)

References 

Discography
Discographies of British artists
Rock music discographies